The Minnesota South District is one of the 35 districts of the Lutheran Church–Missouri Synod (LCMS), and covers the southern third of the state of Minnesota including the Twin Cities area; it also includes two congregations in Wisconsin. The northern two thirds of Minnesota constitute the Minnesota North District, and the rest of Wisconsin is divided between the North Wisconsin and South Wisconsin Districts. In addition, two Minnesota congregations are in the non-geographic English District. The Minnesota South District includes approximately 246 congregations and missions, subdivided into 24 circuits, as well as 49 preschools, 45 elementary schools and 7 high schools. Baptized membership in district congregations is approximately 127,000.

The Minnesota South District was formed in 1963 when the Minnesota District was divided. District offices are located in Burnsville, Minnesota. Delegates from each congregation meet in convention every three years to elect the district president, vice presidents, circuit counselors, a board of directors, and other officers. The Rev. Dr. Lucas Woodford has been the district president since 2018. 

Concordia University, Saint Paul, part of the LCMS Concordia University System, is located within the district.

Presidents
Rev. Ernest H. Stahlke, 1963–66
Rev. Martin W. Lieske, 1966–78
Rev. O. H. Cloeter, 1978–91
Rev. Lane R. Seitz, 1991–2012
Rev. Dr. Dean Nadasdy, 2012-2018
Rev. Dr. Lucas Woodford, 2018-present

References

External links
Minnesota South District web site
LCMS: Minnesota South District
LCMS Congregation Directory
Synodal-Bericht des Minnesota und Dakota Distrikts der Deutschen Evang.-Luth. Synode von Missouri, Ohio und Andern Staaten (1882–1889)
Synodal-Bericht des Minnesota und Dakota Distrikts der Deutschen Evang.-Luth. Synode von Missouri, Ohio und Andern Staaten (1891–1910)

Lutheran Church–Missouri Synod districts
Lutheranism in Minnesota
Lutheranism in Wisconsin
Christian organizations established in 1963
Burnsville, Minnesota
1963 establishments in Minnesota